is a hot spring resort in the Zainiwasaka district of the city of Fukushima, Fukushima, Japan. It is in the mountains about 14 km west of Fukushima Station.

Description
Takayu Onsen is halfway up the slopes of Mount Azuma, near the entrance to the Bandai-Azuma Skyline sightseeing road, due west of the centre of Fukushima city.

The hot springs were first developed during the Sengoku period, around 400 years ago, and consist of around a dozen ryokan, many of which open up their baths to non-staying guests during the day for a small fee. The most famous among them is the historic Tamagoyu, a small wooden bathhouse with one pool each per gender. There is a public bathhouse, the Attaka no Yu, and a free outdoor foot bath at the center of the small town.

The strongly acidic water is rich in hydrogen sulfide, which results in a slightly milky, blue water and a distinctive "rotten egg" smell. To maintain the high quality of the water, many ryokan channel it directly and unadulterated into their baths.

Access

By car
From the east, Takayu can be reached from Fukushima, taking Fukushima Prefectural Route 70 west.

Access from the west is via the Bandai-Azuma Skyline (a toll-free road).

By bus

References

Hot springs of Fukushima Prefecture
Tourist attractions in Fukushima Prefecture
Spa towns in Japan
Fukushima (city)